This is a list of diplomatic missions of Chad, excluding honorary consulates.

Africa

 Algiers (Embassy)

 Cotonou (Consulate)

 Ouagadougou (Embassy)

 Yaoundé (Embassy)
 Douala (Consulate)
 Garoua (Consulate)

 Bangui (Embassy)

 Kinshasa (Embassy)

 Kinshasa (Embassy)

 Cairo (Embassy)

 Malabo (Embassy)

 Addis Ababa (Embassy)

 Libreville (Embassy)

 Abidjan (Embassy)

 Tripoli (Embassy)

 Bamako (Embassy)

 Rabat (Embassy)

 Niamey (Embassy)

 Abuja (Embassy)
 Maiduguri (Consulate)

 Pretoria (Embassy)

 Khartoum (Embassy)
 Geneina (Consulate-General)

Americas

 Ottawa (Embassy)

 Washington, D.C. (Embassy)

Asia

 Beijing (Embassy)

 New Delhi (Embassy)

 Tel Aviv (Embassy)

 Kuwait City (Embassy)

 Doha (Embassy)

 Riyadh (Embassy)
 Jeddah (Consulate-General)

 Ankara (Embassy)

 Abu Dhabi (Embassy)
 Dubai (Consulate-General)

Europe

 Brussels (Embassy)

 Paris (Embassy)

 Berlin (Embassy)

 Moscow (Embassy)

Multilateral organizations

Geneva (Permanent Mission to the United Nations and other international organizations)
New York City (Permanent Mission to the United Nations)

Paris (Permanent Mission to UNESCO)

Gallery

Closed missions

Africa

See also
 Foreign relations of Chad
 List of diplomatic missions in Chad
 Visa policy of Chad

References

 Government of Chad

Diplomatic missions

Chad